Salomón Huerta is a painter based in Los Angeles, California who comes from Tijuana, Mexico , and grew up in the Boyle Heights Projects in East Los Angeles. Huerta received a full scholarship to attend the Art Center College of Design in Pasadena and completed his MFA at UCLA in 1998. Huerta gained critical acclaim and commercial attention in the late 1990s for his minimalist portraits of the backs of people's heads and color-saturated depictions of domestic urban architecture. He was included in the 2000 Whitney Biennial and has been featured in numerous exhibitions around the US, Europe, and Latin America such as The Gagosian Gallery in London, England, and Studio La Città in Verona, Italy. Salomón Huerta is currently represented by Louise Alexander Gallery/There There in Los Angeles, California, and Porto Cervo, Italy.

Let Everything Else Burn
In 2012 Huerta published the artist book Let Everything Else Burn, a collection of short autobiographical texts paired with well-known artworks and archived images of his personal history and past. Unique to this artist's book is a selection of never before published images of his artwork since the 1990s. This limited editioned book was published by LM Projects, edited by Elizabeth Pulsinelli, and includes a foreword by David Pagel.

Biography 

1965 	Born in La Colonia Libertad, Tijuana

1991 	BFA, Art Center College of Design, Pasadena, CA

1998	MFA, UCLA Graduate School, Los Angeles, CA

Solo Exhibitions

2019
Humanizing the Other: Art by Salomón Huerta, Kwan Fong Gallery, Thousand Oaks, CA

2018
Still Lifes, There There, Los Angeles, CA

2014 
Christopher Grimes Gallery, Santa Monica, CA

2008       
Mask, Patrick Painter Inc., Santa Monica, CA

2005       
Portrait of a Friend, Patricia Faure Gallery, Santa Monica, CA

2003       
Patricia Faure Gallery, Santa Monica, CA

2002       
Studio La Citta, Italy

2001       
Gagosian Gallery, London
Salomon Huerta Paintings, Austin Museum of Art, Texas (catalogue)

2000      
Patricia Faure Gallery, Santa Monica, CA

1999      
Patricia Faure Gallery, Santa Monica, CA

1994      
Julie Rico Gallery, Santa Monica, CA

1993      
Julie Rico Gallery, Santa Monica, CA

Selected Group Exhibitions

2019 
¡Chicanismo!: The Sanchez Collection, AD&A Museum, UC Santa Barbara, Santa Barbara, CA

2017 
Home—So Different, So Appealing: Art from the Americas since 1957, Los Angeles County Museum of Art, Los Angeles, CA

2011 
So, Who Do You Think You Are?, San Jose Museum of Art, San Jose, CA

2010    
A Group Painting Show, Patrick Painter, Inc., Santa Monica, CA

2009    
Superficiality and Superexcrescence, Ben Maltz Gallery, Otis College of Art and Design, Los Angeles, CA
Here's Looking at You, Stephen Cohen Gallery, Los Angeles, CA

2008    
My Generation, Spichernohe, Koln, Germany

2007    
Strange New Worlds, Tijuana, Santa Monica Museum of Art, Santa Monica, CA
Exquisite Crisis and Encounters, Asian/Pacific/American Institute, NYU, New York, NY

2006    
Strange New Worlds, Tijuana, La Jolla Museum, La Jolla CA
Transactions: Contemporary Latin American and Latino Art, Museum of Contemporary Art Diego, San Diego, CA
Retratos, San Antonio Museum, San Antonio, TX, Traveling: National Portrait Gallery at the S. Dillion Ripley Center, Smithsonian Institution, Washington, D.C.

2005    
Group Show, Robert Miller, NY, NY
Group Show, El Museo del Barrio, NY, NY
Retratos, El Museo del Barrio, NY, NY
High Drama, Georgia Museum of Art, Athens, GA, Traveling to: McNay Art Museum, San Antonio, TX, Long Beach Museum of Art, Long Beach, CA, Allentown Art Museum, Allentown, Pa
New Watercolors, Patricia Faure Gallery, Santa Monica, CA

2004     
White on White, Patricia Faure Gallery, Santa Monica, CA

2003     
Intimates, Angles Gallery, Los Angeles, CA
The Great Drawing Show, Michael Kohn Gallery, Los Angeles, CA
               
2002     
Art on Paper, Weatherspoon Art Museum, Greensboro, NC
Phoenix Triennial 2001, Contemporary Art: AZ CA MX NM TX, Phoenix Art Museum

2000 	
Studio la Città Verona
The Next Wave: New Painting in Southern California, California Center for the Arts Escondido
East of the River: Chicano Art Collectors Anonymous, Santa Monica Museum of Art
Whitney Biennial, Whitney Museum of American Art, NY NY

1999 	
Five Countries and One City, Mexico City Museum Mexico City

1998	
Patricia Faure Gallery Santa Monica

1997 	
LA Current, Armand Hammer Museum Gallery Westwood

1995 	
Vital Signs, Municipal Art Gallery Los Angeles

1994	
El Expectio Chicano, Mt. San Antonio College Pomona

Selected Public Collections

Whitney Museum of American Art, New York, NY
The Museum of Contemporary Art, Los Angeles, CA
Los Angeles County Museum of Art, Los Angeles, CA
Museum of Contemporary Art, San Diego, La Jolla, CA
Ulrich Museum of Art, Wichita, KS
Worcester Museum of Art, Worcester, MA
Colby College Museum, Waterville, ME
CAA, Beverly Hills, CA
Fisher Gallery, University of Southern California, Los Angeles, CA

External links 
 Let Everything Else Burn, artist talk at RedCat
 LACMA Prints
 Salomón Huerta, Let Everything Else Burn (LA Weekly)
 Salomón Huerta: House Painter (kcet.org)
 Artscene
 Artnet, The New Latin Cool
 Artnet Stats
 Austin Museum of Art
 Youtube - MOCA conversation with David Pagel
 Vimeo - MOCA conversation with David Pagel
 The Latino Art Museum
 Artnews
 The Art Reserve
 Flavorpill
 Los Angeles Times, April 2008
 Art in America, January 2009
 Art Limited, Jan/Feb 2009
 Encore Magazine, July 2010

Living people
Year of birth missing (living people)